Jamila Debbech Ksiksi (14 August 1968 – 19 December 2022) was a Tunisian politician from Ennahda. In 2014, she was elected to the Assembly of the Representatives of the People becoming the country's first Black woman MP. 

On 19 December 2022, she was killed alongside her sister in a traffic collision near Sfax, at the age of 54.

References 

1968 births
2022 deaths
Ennahda politicians
21st-century Tunisian women politicians
21st-century Tunisian politicians
Tunisian Muslims
Arab anti-racism activists
Members of the Pan-African Parliament from Tunisia
Members of the Assembly of the Representatives of the People
Road incident deaths in Tunisia